Ussara chrysangela is a species of sedge moth in the genus Ussara. It was described by Edward Meyrick in 1922. It is found in Peru.

References

Moths described in 1922
Glyphipterigidae